Captain James Carson was a pseudonym used by the Stratemeyer Syndicate for the five volume "Saddle Boys" series.

Book titles
The Saddle Boys Of The Rockies (1913)
The Saddle Boys In The Grand Canyon (1913)
The Saddle Boys On The Plains (1913)
The Saddle Boys At Circle Ranch (1913)
The Saddle Boys On Mexican Trails (1915)

External links
 
 

Stratemeyer Syndicate pseudonyms